Jacques Parent may refer to:

 Jacques Parent (fencer), French Olympic fencer
 Jacques Parent (politician) (1862–1918), Canadian politician